Chyingtaw  is a village in north-eastern Burma. It is located in Chipwi Township in Myitkyina District in the Kachin State.

References

Populated places in Kachin State
Chipwi Township